Local elections were held in the Federation of Malaya in 1954.

Municipal election

George Town

Kuala Lumpur

Malacca

Town councils election

Alor Star

Bandar Maharani, Muar

Bandar Penggaram, Batu Pahat

Bukit Mertajam

Butterworth

Ipoh-Menglembu

Johore Bahru

Klang

Kluang

Kota Bharu

Kuala Trengganu

Kuantan

Pasir Mas

Pasir Puteh

Segamat

Seremban

Sungei Patani

Taiping

Teluk Anson

Tumpat

Local councils election

Padang Serai

Pulai Chondong

Senggarang, Batu Pahat

References

1954
1954 elections in Malaya
1954 elections in Asia